The Focus Community Newspaper is a weekly newspaper based in Brodheadsville, Pennsylvania. It serves portions of Monroe, Carbon, Northampton, Lehigh counties in Pennsylvania and Warren County, New Jersey. The Focus has a circulation of 25,000, and its content consists mainly of classified ads, but also includes some community-based articles.

The Focus has been in print since November 1988. In June 1991, it was purchased by Pauline Roberti (Brotzman) and Denise D'Amico, who are current owners.

External links
Official site

Newspapers published in Pennsylvania